Le Triomphant is a strategic nuclear submarine of the French Navy; the submarine is the lead boat of her class commissioned in 1997 with the home port of Île Longue. The vessel carries sixteen strategic missiles, whose launch can only be authorized by the President of France.

History

Construction and testing

The first metal of Le Triomphant was cut at DCN Cherbourg in October 1986, and the boat's engine was shipped to the boat from DCN Indret five years later. The reactor was built into the vessel in August 1991, with the fore and aft sections being welded on in January and April 1992 respectively. The boat was armed and given a commander in May 1992 and moved from the assembly site to the completion basin in July 1993. The boat's launching in March 1994 was followed by the first dive that June and the trip from DCN Cherbourg to lle Longue that July down the "free route" between Cherbourg and Brest, with a crew of 110 and engineers from DCN Cherbourg. On 4 January 1995, during testing, the boat reached maximum depth for the first time and made the first firing of a ballistic missile the following month. Photographs of the boat were exhibited to the Senate of France from 15 to 23 May 1995. In June, the boat set off back to Cherbourg for Post-Testing Upgrades (Remises A Niveau Après Essais or RANAE), then set off for a second set of trials, making 1,300 hours of test dives in total and a five-week trip. The boat then spent five weeks in maintenance at Cherbourg and during the main weapons tests took on 11 torpedo models, five trial torpedoes and one Exocet SM39 exercise. As a deterrent system, a salvo of 15 models was successfully launched and, in the last round of development, the boat functioned successfully as a missile platform.

Characteristics

Conventional and nuclear armament

Le Triomphant entered active service in March 1997. On 18 October 2001, the fleet support service notified the DCN that Triomphant was about to take the first period of Unavailability for Maintenance and Repairs (IPER or Indisponibilité pour Entretien et Réparations). The 150 million Euro contract was granted to DCN, with the IPER starting at Ile Longue on 2 April 2002, scheduled for 29 months in all. In this, the boat's first major refit, the missiles and the fuel elements of the nuclear boiler were disembarked. In August 2004 L'Humanité ran a piece with the headline "Pas si Triomphant que ça" reporting that Le Triomphant had suffered a nuclear leak from one of her nuclear warheads by the end of 1997 and from her reactor in 2004, though the FOST downplayed the incidents and stated no radiation had been released since the reactor had been non-operational at the time. Le Triomphant carried out a test flight of a M45 strategic missile on 1 February 2005 in the Atlantic.

Since 1972, patrols by Submarines forces are conducted 24/7 365/year, embarking each sixteen strategic missiles, which launching can only be authorized by the President of France, and which could destroy 96 targets with an equivalent effect of a hundred times the explosions of Hiroshima and Nagasaki.

Active service 

In the night between 3–4 February 2009, Le Triomphant collided with the Royal Navy submarine  in the Atlantic. Both vessels returned to home bases under their own power, Vanguard to Her Majesty's Naval Base Clyde in the Firth of Clyde on 14 February 2009, and Le Triomphant to Île Longue in Brittany, escorted by a frigate as per procedure. The French Navy originally reported that Le Triomphant had "collided with an immersed object (probably a container)". After Vanguard returned to harbour, it was confirmed that the light brief contact collision was in fact with the designated boat.

See also 

List of submarines of France

References

External links
www.netmarine.net

Triomphant-class submarines
Ships built in France
1994 ships
Submarines of France